Jussi Award for Best Finnish Film is an award presented annually at the Jussi Awards by Filmiaura, a Finnish film organization founded in 1962. The 1st Jussi Awards ceremony was held in 1944, but the award for Best Film was introduced in 1986 at the 41st Jussi Awards where Shadows in Paradise won the first award. The category was absent for the next five years but the award was presented again at the 47th Jussi Awards, and has since been presented annually.

The Best Film award was presented to the awarded film's director, producer and the production company (with the exception of 1986) until 2008. Since 2008 the award has been given to the film's producer only.

Winners and nominees

Multiple winners

References

External links
 

Finnish Film